United Nations Security Council resolution 626, adopted unanimously on 20 December 1988, after noting an agreement between Angola and Cuba regarding the withdrawal of Cuban troops from Angola and considering a report by the Secretary-General, the Council endorsed the report and established the United Nations Angola Verification Mission I for a period of thirty-one months.

The Council decided the mission would enter into force once the tripartite accord between Angola, Cuba and South Africa had been signed as well as the agreement between Angola and Cuba, requesting the Secretary-General to report to the Council immediately after the agreement was signed.

On 22 December 1988, both bipartite and tripartite agreements were signed in New York City, which helped pave the way for the independence of Namibia and the withdrawal of 50,000 Cuban troops from Angola.

See also
 Angolan Civil War
 Angola–South Africa relations
 Brazzaville Protocol
 Cuban intervention in Angola
 Establishment of United Nations Angola Verification Mission II in Resolution 696 (1991)
 List of United Nations Security Council Resolutions 601 to 700 (1987–1991)
 South African Border Wars
 Apartheid
 United Nations Security Council Resolution 602

References

External links
 
Text of the Resolution at undocs.org

 0626
20th century in South Africa
1988 in South Africa
1988 in Africa
1988 in Angola
1988 in Cuba
 0626
 0626
 0626
Angolan Civil War
Angola–South Africa relations
December 1988 events